The Mocuio Formation is a Late Cretaceous sedimentary rock formation found in southern Angola. It extends from the latest Campanian to the Early Maastrichtian. Many vertebrate fossils have been collected from the formation.

Paleofauna

See also 

 Lists of fossiliferous stratigraphic units in Africa
 List of fossiliferous stratigraphic units in Angola
 Geology of Angola

References 

Geologic formations of Angola
Upper Cretaceous Series of Africa
Campanian Stage
Maastrichtian Stage
Sandstone formations
Paleontology in Angola